Mohanad Mostafa Ahmed Abdelmonem Lasheen (born May 29, 1996) is an Egyptian professional footballer who plays as a central midfielder for the Egyptian club Tala'ea El Gaish SC.

Career
In March 2016, Mostafa was promoted from youth team to first team in Ismaily, but he moved six month later to Alassiouty Sport in the Egyptian Second Division and signed a 2-year contract. Mostafa was part of the Alassiouty's squad that promoted to 2017–18 Egyptian Premier League, he also scored the winning goal in the match that guaranteed the promotion for the club before 5 weeks from the end of the season. In April 2017, Ismaily SC made negotiations with Alassiouty to sign the player.

References

External links
Mohanad Lasheen at KOOORA.com
Mohanad Lasheen at Footballdatabase

1996 births
Living people
Egyptian footballers
Egyptian Premier League players
Association football midfielders
Ismaily SC players
Pyramids FC players
Tala'ea El Gaish SC players
2021 Africa Cup of Nations players
Egypt international footballers